Lambusart is a village of Wallonia and a district of the municipality of Fleurus located in the province of Hainaut, Belgium.

References

Former municipalities of Hainaut (province)